Dolls of Pain is a dark electro band from France founded in 2003.  It performs primarily in English.

Biography 
The band was founded in 2003 by 
Olivier (songwriter) and Cédric (keyboards). (The band identifies its members only by their first name.) Several months later, Laurent (vocals) and Stéphane (guitar) joined the band. In July 2009 Stéphane left the band, and Nicolas (keyboards in live performance) joined. Olivier continued to play keyboards in the studio, but switched to the guitar on stage. 

In early 2005, the band released its first album on Urgence Disk, a Swiss record label. 

Dolls of Pain has performed throughout Europe since 2003 (France, Germany, England, Switzerland, Belgium, Luxembourg, the Netherlands).

The band released three albums on Urgence Disk and three remix compilations produced by Auto-Restriction Production (ARP) and released as free downloads. Subsequently, then signed with the Hungarian record label Advoxya Records.

The band has released remixes of other dark electro groups such as Miss Construction, HausHetaere and Bak XIII. 

The band has performed at music festivals including Gothic Family Festival (Germany), Dungeon Open Air Festival (Germany) and Gothic Festival (Belgium), and on 30 May 2009 at Wave-Gotik-Treffen (WGT) in Leipzig. It is scheduled to perform at the Energy Open Air festival in Cherkasy, Ukraine on 14 July 2012.

Discography

Albums 
 Emprise (CDR), Auto-Restriction Production, 2003 
 Dominer (CD, mini album), Auto-Restriction Production, 2004 
 Dec[a]dance  (2 versions), Urgence Disk Records, 2006
 Dominer Remixes (MP3), Mekkanikal Industries, 2006 
 Slavehunter (CD, album), Urgence Disk Records, 2007 
 Mixxxhunter (MP3, album), Auto-Restriction Production, 2008 	
 Cybermanipulations (MP3, album), Auto-Restriction Production, 2009 
 Cybersex (CD, album), Auto-Restriction Production, Urgence Disk Records, 2009 
 Strange Kiss (CD, EP), Advoxya Records, 2010 
 The Last Conflict (CD, album), Advoxya Records, 2011
 Déréliction (2xCD, Album, Ltd), Advoxya Records, 2013

Compilations 
 Inside : Nihilista (CD, compilation)	Hydra, Nihilista, 2007
 Precious Tears (Down In Hell Mix By Cold Drive) : Ultra Dark Radio - Compilation Volume III (MP3, compilation), Ultra Dark Radio, 2008
 Cybersex (Leaether Strip Remix) : Extreme Lustlieder 3 (CD, album, compilation), UpScene, Indigo, 2009 	
 Addiction (Endzeit Version) : Endzeit Bunkertracks [Act V] (4xCD, compilation), Alfa Matrix,	2010 	
 Lobotomy (Exit Version) : Electronic Aid To Haiti (MP3, compilation), Sigsaly Transmissions, 2010

Remixes 
 Short Circuit (DOPMix) : Transfer_ERROR - Short Circuit (Remixes) (MP3), Mekkanikal Industries, 2005
 Philippe F (Hot Ketchup Remix) : Philippe F featuring Gibet - Philippe F Remixes (MP3), Walnut + Locust, 2006 	
 Cold Massive Blue (Dolls Of Pain Remix) : Wynardtage - Praise The Fallen – The Remixes/Silver Edition, Rupal Records, 2007		
 New-Wave : Hynnner Vs Hant1s3 - EgoVox (CD, Album), Urgence Disk Records, 2008
 Space Baby (Dolls Of Pain RMX) : Playmate On The Run - Playmates On Speed (2xCD, Comp), Artek Lab, 2008 	
 Popsong For The Alienated (DOPmixXx) : Blackula - Remixes By The Alienating (MP3), Abyssa, 2008 	
 Electro Beast (Remixed By Dolls Of Pain) : Miss Construction - Kunstprodukt (CD, Album), Fear Section, 2008 	
 Open The Borders (Dolls Of Pain Remix) : Bak XIII - We Are Alive (CD, Single), Urgence Disk Records, 2009 	
 Crawling In The Dark (Dolls Of Pain Remix) : Freakangel - The Faults Of Humanity (CD, Album + CD, Album, Ltd), Alfa Matrix, 2010
 Sky (Dolls Of Pain Version) : HausHetaere - Syndicate + Syndicus (2xCD, Album, Ltd), Alfa Matrix, 2010 	
 The Next Chapter (Dolls Of Pain Re_mixxx) : Alien Produkt - The Next Chapter (CD, EP), Advoxya, 2010

References

External links 
 

French electronic music groups